Mudaria is a genus of moths of the family Noctuidae.

Species
 Mudaria albonotata (Hampson, 1893)
 Mudaria arida (Rothschild, 1913)
 Mudaria cornifrons Moore, 1893
 Mudaria fisherae Prout, 1928
 Mudaria gigas (Holloway, 1982)
 Mudaria leprosa (Hampson, 1898)
 Mudaria leprosticta (Hampson, 1907)
 Mudaria luteileprosa Holloway, 1989
 Mudaria magniplaga (Walker, 1858)
 Mudaria major (Warren, 1914)
 Mudaria minor (Holloway, 1982)
 Mudaria minoroides Holloway, 1989
 Mudaria nubes (Kobes, 1982)
 Mudaria rudolfi (Kobes, 1982)
 Mudaria solidata (Warren, 1914)
 Mudaria tayi (Holloway, 1976)
 Mudaria turbata (Walker, 1858)
 Mudaria variabilis Roepke, 1916
 Mudaria wallacea (Holloway, 1982)

References
Natural History Museum Lepidoptera genus database
Mudaria at funet

Hadeninae